Ibbs and Tillett was a London-based classical music artist and concert management agency that flourished between 1906 and 1990 in the United Kingdom. It was described as "one of the legendary duos in classical music artist management".

Founding
Ibbs and Tillett was founded by Robert Leigh Ibbs and John Tillett, who trained under impresario Nathaniel Vert (Narciso Vertigliano).  It was Vert who, as Edward Elgar's concert manager,  sent Elgar's Enigma Variations to another of his concert management clients,  Vienna Philharmonic Orchestra conductor Hans Richter,  who premiered the work in London in 1899.

Management
John Tillett's widow, Emmie Tillett, managed the agency after the deaths of the founders, and became one of the world's best-known managers; she was nicknamed the "Duchess of Wigmore Street".

See also
 Classical music of the United Kingdom

References

English music managers
Music promoters
Arts managers